The "Schnitzelbank" is a simple song, popular primarily with German Americans.

Etymology 
Schnitzelbank literally means "scrap bench" or "chip bench" (from Schnitzel "scraps / clips / cuttings (from carving)" or the colloquial verb schnitzeln "to make scraps" or "to carve" and Bank "bench"); like the Bank, it is feminine and takes the article "die". It is a woodworking tool used in Germany prior to the industrial revolution. It was in regular use in colonial New England, and in the Appalachian region until early in the 20th century; it is still in use by specialist artisans today. In American English, it is known as a shaving horse. It uses the mechanical advantage of a foot-operated lever to securely clamp the object to be carved. The shaving horse is used in combination with the drawknife or spokeshave to cut down green or seasoned wood, to accomplish jobs such as handling an ax; creating wooden rakes, hay forks, walking sticks, etc. The shaving horse was used by various trades, from farmer to basketmaker and wheelwright.

A Schnitzelbank is also a short rhyming verse or song with humorous content, often but not always sung with instrumental accompaniment. Each verse in a Schnitzelbank introduces a topic and ends with a comedic twist. This meaning of the word is mainly used in Switzerland and southwestern Germany; it is masculine and takes the article "der". It is a main element of the Fasnacht celebrations in the city of Basel, where it is also written Schnitzelbangg. Schnitzelbänke (pl.) are also sung at weddings and other festivities by the Schnitzelbänkler, a single person or small group. Often the Schnitzelbänkler will display posters called Helgen during some verses that depict the topic but do not give away the joke.

Song

A German-language ditty for children "The Schnitzelbank Song" is popular among German Americans with an interest in learning or teaching German to their offspring.  It is often sung by adults for entertainment and nostalgia. Versions were published in the United States at least as early as 1900.

The responsive lyrical structure of the verse and refrain are referenced in Moritz Reymond's 1877 book Das neue Laienbrevier des Haeckelismus, which uses German folk and student songs to burlesque ideas regarding organic evolution. Some of the lyrical ideas and phrases are also included (albeit in a different form) in Volume 9 of Karl Simrock's 13-volume 1856 collection of German stories and poems titled Die deutschen Volksbücher. Within this volume, the lyrics are included in a book titled Das deutsche Kinderbuch (The German Children's Book), which may have originally been published in 1848. The text includes many ideas common to the modern song, including "kurz und lang" ("short and long"), "hin und her" ("back and forth"), "krumm und grad" ("bent and straight"), and the "ei du schöne Schnitzelbank" refrain.

Groucho Marx was performing it in Vaudeville by 1910.

In the 1932 film Downstairs, set on a baronial estate in Austria, nefarious chauffeur Karl  (John Gilbert) sings the song with butler Albert ( Paul Lukas ) and Albert’s beautiful new young wife, Anna (Virginia Bruce), at dinner, trying to ingratiate himself with them. The audience already knows that Karl is a con artist, thief, seducer and blackmailer, so the cheerful little song has an ominous effect.

The Big Bad Wolf sings a version of the song to his offspring in the 1936 Walt Disney Silly Symphony cartoon Three Little Wolves.

Cary Grant, Joan Bennett, and Gene Lockhart sing a version of the song in the film Wedding Present (1936). Later, Joan Bennett's character uses the tune to the song to mock Cary Grant's character for his hypocritical behavior after being promoted.

William Frawley performs an English version of this song in the 1942 World War II propaganda musical The Yankee Doodler.

The song appears with alternate lyrics in the 1949 Noveltoon Little Red School Mouse.

Another version is included in Billy Wilder's 1953 film Stalag 17. American POWs sing it during a volleyball game to distract guards from spotting a contraband radio antenna hidden in the net.

In 1957, Bill Haley & His Comets recorded a rock and roll version called "Rockin' Rollin' Schnitzelbank" for their album Rockin' Around the World.

Bing Crosby included the song in a medley on his album 101 Gang Songs (1961).

In a 1965 episode of The Munsters, Herman (Fred Gwynne) sing-songs a version of the song while imitating a police sketch artist: "lantern jaw, piercing eyes, classic nose, is das nicht ein classic nose?" etc.

In the 1971 animated special The Cat in the Hat, the song "Cat, Hat" has a brief section in German, in which the Cat sings, "Ist das nicht ein Katze Hut?" (Is this not a cat hat?), and the children respond, "Ja das ist ein Katze Hut" (Yes, that is a cat hat).

Pennsylvania singer John Schmid (born in 1949) sings a Pennsylvania German version of the Schnitzelbank song; it was uploaded to YouTube in 2010.

In 1994, Steven Spielberg's popular cartoon show Animaniacs featured a segment using a version of the song, with heavily modified lyrics. In the sketch, Yakko, Wakko, and Dot travel to Germany to learn the song (referred to as the "International Friendship Song" in the show) from Professor Otto von Schnitzelpusskrankengescheitmeyer, a one-shot character voiced by Jim Cummings.

Comedian Mel Blanc recorded a novelty Christmas song in the 1950s, "Yah Das Ist Ein Christmas Tree", which borrows the tune and concept.  This was itself parodied by singer/comedian Joel Kopischke in 2005 as "Stupid Christmas Song".

The Dutch Country troubadour, Percy Einsig (1902–1971) recorded a popular rendition of "Schnitzelbank" at Up-Town Records, Reading, Pennsylvania. He was also made famous in the Pennsylvania Dutch area for his song titled "The Ford Machine".

See also
 Cantastoria
 Mack the Knife
 Must Be Santa

References

Further reading 
 William D. Keel: A German-American Cultural Icon: O, du schöne Schnitzelbank, in Yearbook of German-American studies, Society for German American Studies, 38th Ed., 2003, pp. 221–236
 Stewart Eastman: A Schnitzelbank Stein – about the history, January 2010

External links 
 Is das net die Hobelbank, one German version today

German children's songs
German folk songs
German-American history
Fictional objects
Cumulative songs